Munetaka (written: 宗尊, 宗堯, 宗孝, or 宗貴) is a masculine Japanese given name. Notable people with the name include:

 (1242–1274), Japanese shōgun
 (1958–2008), Japanese musician and record producer
 (1705–1730), Japanese daimyō

Japanese masculine given names